Conversations with Warne Volume 1 is an album by saxophonist Pete Christlieb's Quartet featuring Warne Marsh which was recorded in 1978 and released on the Dutch Criss Cross Jazz label in 1991.

Reception 

The Allmusic review states "Christlieb, a powerful player himself, blends in well with Marsh and the results are both complementary and competitive. ... This stimulating music is easily recommended to fans of straight-ahead jazz and the Tristano school; Christlieb not only held his own with Marsh, but clearly inspired him".

Track listing 
All compositions by Pete Christlieb and Jim Hughart
 "Lunch" – 8:29
 "Fishtale" – 4:35
 "Meat Balls" – 7:03
 "Get Out!" – 6:38
 "Weeping Willow" – 6:15
 "India No Place" – 6:50
 "You Drive!" – 7:20
 "Woody and You" – 4:25

Personnel 
Pete Christlieb, Warne Marsh – tenor saxophone
Jim Hughart – bass
Nick Ceroli – drums

References 

Pete Christlieb albums
Warne Marsh albums
1991 albums
Criss Cross Jazz albums